The 1968–69 Yorkshire Football League was the 43rd season in the history of the Yorkshire Football League, a football competition in England.

Division One

Division One featured 14 clubs which competed in the previous season, along with four new clubs, promoted from Division Two:
Hamptons Sports
Lincoln United
Retford Town reserves
Thackley

League table

Map

Division Two

Division Two featured eleven clubs which competed in the previous season, along with seven new clubs.
Clubs relegated from Division One:
Stocksbridge Works
Plus:
Frecheville Community Association, joined from the Sheffield Association League
Guiseley, joined from the West Yorkshire League
Hall Road Rangers, joined from the West Riding County League

League table

Map

League Cup

Final

References

1968–69 in English football leagues
Yorkshire Football League